Admiral Firmus Piett is a fictional character from the Star Wars franchise, first introduced and portrayed by Kenneth Colley in the 1980 film The Empire Strikes Back. As a supporting villain in command of Darth Vader's flagship, Executor, Piett is generally considered to be the most prominent Imperial officer in the film. He subsequently appeared in the sequel Return of the Jedi, making him the only officer in the original trilogy to appear in more than one film and be portrayed by the same actor. Piett also appears in the canon Star Wars novel Lost Stars, and is featured in several more novels, comic books, and video games within the Star Wars Legends line.

Character

Development
Piett was a creation of George Lucas and Lawrence Kasdan for The Empire Strikes Back and Return of the Jedi. Kasdan was aware that there was fun to be had in giving more depth and variability to his background characters, not only to help viewers identify them, but to remind his audience that much of the Empire consisted of people just doing their jobs. Although Admiral Piett's true first appearance in the Star Wars universe was one month prior to the release of the Empire Strikes Back in the film's novelization, he was brought to life to audiences around the world by British actor Kenneth Colley, who was cast in the role. Colley recalls that Empire Strikes Back director Irvin Kershner stated that for Piett, he was "looking for someone that would frighten Adolf Hitler", and told Colley after meeting him, "Yes, I think you're it". In playing the role, Colley chose not to portray a singular attitude for the character; but instead attempted to bring forth a more true to life humanity in Piett's character, something that he believes ultimately sat quite well with audiences.

Appearances

Film

The Empire Strikes Back 
Piett serves in the Galactic Empire as first officer and captain of the Super Star Destroyer, Executor, Darth Vader's flagship. While in search of the Rebel base, under the command of Admiral Ozzel, Piett receives a suspicious transmission from an Imperial probe droid located in the Hoth system. Although dismissed and ignored by Admiral Ozzel, Piett supersedes his superior and informs Vader of the transmission; which in fact does turn out to be the hidden Rebel Alliance headquarters, Echo Base. Vader then dispatches the Imperial fleet to Hoth; however, Ozzel orders the fleet to exit hyperspace too close to the planet, enabling them to be detected by the Rebels, who raise an energy shield to stop any orbital bombardment. Ozzel is quickly executed by Vader for his incompetence. Vader then promotes Piett to Admiral, giving him full command of the Destroyer.

After the Battle of Hoth, Piett is tasked with the pursuit of the Millennium Falcon, which has escaped into a nearby asteroid field. Piett informs Vader of this, whilst Vader is in his meditation chamber aboard the Executor; in doing so, Piett becomes the first onscreen character to see Vader without his helmet. Vader at first ignores Piett's concern over venturing into the field, but later commands the admiral to move the ship away from the asteroids, in order to gain a clear signal for Vader's communication with Emperor Palpatine. Vader subsequently hires bounty hunters to assist in the capture of the Millennium Falcon, a decision which Piett appears to disdain. With the Falcon continuing to evade capture, Vader executes Star Destroyer Avenger captain Lorth Needa, conveying his displeasure as an ominous warning to Piett.

With bounty hunter Boba Fett tracking the Falcon to Cloud City on Bespin, Piett has his engineers deactivate the hyperdrive on the ship. Later attempting to escape, the Millennium Falcon, and those within it, are nearly captured when Piett orders the activation of the Executor's tractor beam. However, the Falcon unexpectedly jumps to light-speed and evades capture, as R2-D2 is able to reactivate the hyperdrive. Despite his failure, a visibly terrified Piett finds his life uncharacteristically spared by Vader at the end of the film.

Return of the Jedi
In the following film, Admiral Piett is in command of the Imperial fleet at the Battle of Endor, still aboard the Executor. He first appears in the film when a covert team of Rebels, led by Han Solo aboard the stolen Imperial shuttle, Tydirium, attempt to transmit an older valid security code, to allow them shield access and entry to the forest moon of Endor. Piett is then interrupted by Vader, who informs Piett that he will deal with the shuttle personally.

During the Rebel attack on the second Death Star, Piett receives orders from Emperor Palpatine himself to hold position and keep the Rebels from escaping from the Death Star's fully operational superlaser. The plan is disrupted when the Rebels are ordered by Admiral Ackbar to attack the Star Destroyers at point-blank range, concentrating their fire on the Executor. After the Rebel fleet knocks out the shields protecting the bridge, Piett commands his men to increase firepower to keep anything from getting through. A disabled A-wing fighter, piloted by Arvel Crynyd, then makes a kamikaze maneuver into the Executor bridge, with Piett and Commander Gherant diving into the lower command deck. The incapacitated Destroyer then plunges into the Death Star, exploding in a plume of flame, as Piett meets his demise.

Novels 
As stated in the 2015 Ultimate Star Wars reference book, Piett was born on the Outer Rim world of Axxila, and is confirmed to have the first name Firmus within the new canon. Piett later joins the Imperial Starfleet, and appears in the novel Lost Stars, set eight years after the Clone Wars, under the command of Grand Moff Tarkin at an Imperial annexation on the planet Jelucan.

Star Wars Legends 
Piett has appeared in many novels, comics and video games, now considered to be non-canon and part of Star Wars Legends. He is given a much deeper backstory in these various media; As a young lieutenant, Piett impresses Vader with his skill and loyalty, and the Sith lord soon promotes him to captain of the Star Destroyer Accuser and makes him a member of the Empire's "Death Squadron". Winning widespread respect for his survival after the events of The Empire Strikes Back, Piett also participates in the Battle of Mygeeto, before the events leading to his death in Return of the Jedi.

Reception
Over time, the character has become a favorite amongst fans, due to his unusual longevity. According to Colley, the character of Piett was not originally slated to appear in Return of the Jedi, but George Lucas added him because Lucasfilm had received "a lot of fan mail" about the character.

References

External links 
 
 
 Admiral Piett on IMDb

Characters created by George Lucas
Film characters introduced in 1980
Fictional admirals
Fictional military captains
Fictional military personnel in films
Fictional war veterans
Male characters in film
Male film villains
Star Wars Skywalker Saga characters